Shawnee is a village in Perry County, Ohio, United States. The population was 655 at the 2010 census. It is nine (9) miles south of the county seat of New Lexington.

History
Shawnee had its start in 1872 when the railroad was extended to that point. The village was named after the Shawnee Indians. A post office has been in operation at Shawnee since 1872.

Geography
Shawnee is located at  (39.604861, -82.210185).

Demographics

2010 census
As of the census of 2010, there were 655 people, 235 households, and 179 families living in the village. The racial makeup of the village was 98.0% White, 0.2% African American, and 1.8% from two or more races. Hispanic or Latino of any race were 0.3% of the population.

There were 235 households, of which 38.3% had children under the age of 18 living with them, 51.1% were married couples living together, 16.2% had a female householder with no husband present, 8.9% had a male householder with no wife present, and 23.8% were non-families. 20.9% of all households were made up of individuals, and 6.8% had someone living alone who was 65 years of age or older. The average household size was 2.79 and the average family size was 3.08.

The median age in the village was 34.9 years. 27.8% of residents were under the age of 18; 7.8% were between the ages of 18 and 24; 26.8% were from 25 to 44; 26.2% were from 45 to 64; and 11.3% were 65 years of age or older. The gender makeup of the village was 52.5% male and 47.5% female.

2000 census
As of the census of 2000, there were 608 people, 207 households, and 157 families living in the village. The population density was 305.1 people per square mile (118.0/km). There were 235 housing units at an average density of 117.9 per square mile (45.6/km). The racial makeup of the village was 99.51% White, 0.33% Asian, and 0.16% from two or more races.

There were 207 households, out of which 44.0% had children under the age of 18 living with them, 49.8% were married couples living together, 15.0% had a female householder with no husband present, and 23.7% were non-families. 21.3% of all households were made up of individuals, and 9.7% had someone living alone who was 65 years of age or older. The average household size was 2.94 and the average family size was 3.27.

In the village, the population was spread out, with 31.9% under the age of 18, 8.7% from 18 to 24, 34.2% from 25 to 44, 18.1% from 45 to 64, and 7.1% who were 65 years of age or older. The median age was 31 years. For every 100 females there were 98.7 males. For every 100 females age 18 and over, there were 102.9 males.

The median income for a household in the village was $33,229, and the median income for a family was $37,188. Males had a median income of $30,833 versus $20,833 for females. The per capita income for the village was $11,850. About 14.7% of families and 15.6% of the population were below the poverty line, including 27.4% of those under age 18 and 4.9% of those age 65 or over.

References

External links

 Forgotten Ohio:  Shawnee
 Little Cities of Black Diamonds -Local History Website

Villages in Perry County, Ohio
Villages in Ohio
1872 establishments in Ohio